Andrew Conrad Brown (born February 15, 1944) is a Canadian former professional ice hockey goaltender.

Career 
Brown played with the Detroit Red Wings and the Pittsburgh Penguins of the National Hockey League, the Indianapolis Racers of the World Hockey Association and several teams in the minor leagues.

In the 1973–74 season, he incurred 60 minutes in penalties, then the NHL record for penalty minutes in a season by a goaltender. He was the last goalie to play without a mask in the NHL, on April 7, 1974, in a 6–3 loss to the Atlanta Flames; he continued to play without a mask throughout his three seasons in the WHA. His insistence on playing barefaced earned him the nickname "Fearless".

Personal life 
His father, Adam, also played in the National Hockey League, as a left winger.

Career statistics

Regular season and playoffs

Transactions
 On June 7, 1971, the Detroit Red Wings claimed Brown in the inter-league draft (from Baltimore (AHL)).
 On February 25, 1973, the Detroit Red Wings traded Brown to the Pittsburgh Penguins in exchange for 1973 third-round pick (#39 - Nelson Pyatt).

References

External links

1944 births
Living people
Baltimore Clippers players
Canadian expatriate ice hockey players in the United States
Canadian ice hockey goaltenders
Detroit Red Wings players
Fort Worth Wings players
Guelph Royals players
Ice hockey people from Ontario
Indianapolis Racers players
Johnstown Jets players
Long Island Ducks (ice hockey) players
Pittsburgh Penguins players
Sportspeople from Hamilton, Ontario
Tidewater Wings players
Canadian people of Scottish descent